Fuera de Serie is the 2004 third album by reggaeton duo Lito & Polaco.

It peaked at #2 on Billboard's Latin Tropical Album chart

Track listing
 "Intro"
 "Tú Me Guayaste" (Polaco featuring Nicky Jam)
 "Ojos de Diabla" (featuring Divino)
 "Andamos Prestao" (Polaco)
 "La Calle Está Difícil"
 "Sicario de Barrio" (Lito MC Cassidy featuring Don Chezina)
 "Gata Traicionera" (featuring Jacob)
 "Ella Vive Sola" (featuring Gustavo Laureano)
 "Te Quiero Ver Bailar" (featuring Pablo Portillo)
 "Auxilio" (Lito MC Cassidy)
 "Eso Eso"
 "Na Que Buscar Com Mi Lámpara" (Polaco)
 "Make You Sweat" (featuring Tino & Peaches)
 "Puercos Como Tú"
 "Loco" (Nicky Jam preview track)
 "Te Quedas Callá"

References

 

 

2004 albums
Lito & Polaco albums
Pina Records albums